Frank Williams (October 19, 1872 - October 24, 1900) was an American sailor serving in the United States Navy during the Spanish–American War who received the Medal of Honor for bravery.

Biography
Williams was born October 19, 1872, in Germany, and, after entering the United States Navy, he served as a seaman to fight in the Spanish–American War.

Williams likely drowned on October 24, 1900, while living in Puerto Rico. His body was not recovered.

Medal of Honor citation
Rank and organization: Seaman, U.S. Navy. Born: 19 October 1872, Germany. Accredited to: New York. G.O. No.: 521, 7 July 1899.

Citation:

On board the U.S.S. Marblehead during the operation of cutting the cable leading from Cienfuegos, Cuba, 11 May 1898. Facing the heavy fire of the enemy, Williams displayed extraordinary bravery and coolness throughout this period.

See also

List of Medal of Honor recipients for the Spanish–American War

References

German-born Medal of Honor recipients
1872 births
United States Navy Medal of Honor recipients
United States Navy sailors
American military personnel of the Spanish–American War
German emigrants to the United States
Spanish–American War recipients of the Medal of Honor
1900 deaths